The Hong Kong Book Fair is a book fair organised by the Hong Kong Trade Development Council, held annually (usually in the middle of July) at the Hong Kong Convention and Exhibition Centre, selling and exhibiting books, printed matter, stationery, printing, compact discs and other multimedia publishing.

The annual exhibition at the City Hall organised by the Hong Kong Publishing Federation could be regarded as the predecessor of the Hong Kong Book Fair. The First Hong Kong Book Fair was held in 1990. The Fair has become an annual major event in Hong Kong with the number of visitors reaching new high every year. The organiser, the HKTDC, has always been striving to promote local reading culture. Apart from extensively inviting the public to the Fair to visit and buy books, it also spares no effort in organising diversified cultural activities during the Book Fair period with a view to enhance the contents and quality of the Fair.

During the past 20 years the number of exhibitors has grown from 149 to 504 in 2009, with corresponding growth of attendance from 200,000 to 900,000 in 2009. The Fair has developed from a mere promotion platform for the industry to an annual territory-wide major reading and cultural event for the public of Hong Kong.

History

Origin
Organized by the TDC before the first Hong Kong Book Fair, the Hong Kong publishers on their own in the Hong Kong City Hall held book fair. 1989 after the completion of the first Convention and Exhibition Centre, the publishing industry felt the need to develop the Book Fair a larger, more professional, better service platform for the industry, thus requiring the TDC to assist the industry sponsored book fair. The first book fair was held in 1990.

1997
In 1997, HKCEC completed Book Fair at the Convention which became the first public exhibition at the new wing. Booked this session, the first time set up a "Children's World" pavilion, and the addition of "International Copyright Trade Fair" and "Asian Publishing Conference" to promote copyright trade.

1998
After a survey in 1998, the TDC decided to book fair with all co-organizers only display, demonstrated and sold the first item and books, booked a tour for members of the public activities of the whole family. This also led to the original comic book exhibition at the Hong Kong Book Fair business started all over again, starting the following year the Hong Kong Comics Festival held their own.

1999
Working in 1999 with the time, first set up the night Book Fair Book Fair, on Friday, six hours until 22:00 the exhibition, the first set with the session of the Book "University Square", showing university publications, and the addition of Express Books services. Hong Kong Book Fair as Summer Reading Week.

2001
In line with the TDC 2001 Book Fair, invited the Arts Development Council as sponsor, together with major cultural and educational institutions, at the Book Fair during the launch of a series of culture and promote reading programs, these activities had been expanded this year to the 180 number, with the Book Fair a summer reading activities in Hong Kong Culture Week, highly recommend by the readers of the famous books are the beginning of the year.

2003
Book Fair 2003, an additional directory search online book would not only help readers find books, but also became an online copyright trading center, part of the book fair extended to break the copyright transactions, the manner of restrictions. This year's book fair run from July 29 to Aug 3, and also included an art pavilion where art lovers could attend workshops of their interest.

2004
2004 International Cultural Village Book Fair trial, participating countries, France and Singapore. This year's book fair run from July 21 to 26 and 367 publishers participated in the exhibition.

2005
In 2005, Hong Kong Book Fair was the first time to co-operate with Asia Week and invited the two sides of famous writers, including Professor Long Yingtai, Zhang Yihe, Nanfang Shuo, Su Tong and Chen Kuan-chung in Hong Kong to meet with readers. The enthusiastic response, with over 2,000 people seated, breaking the record book fair over the years. Additional night games for the first time, 6 hours after admission were half price, very good response. The Book Fair attracted nearly 640,000 visitors, compared with 50 million passengers in 2004 increased by 28%, marking the highest increase in visitors since the start.

2006
2006 Book Fair was held from 19 to 24 July; after 6 pm tickets were still half price. 22 July (Saturday) at 9:30 that allowed visitors free entry – scheduled for the 10, but because too many visitors, so the earlier approach time, also closed at 2 am only. In a few hours free time, there were 4.4 million people in attendance. In addition to 22 and 24 July, other days were open until 10 pm. The visitors rose to 680,000 passengers a new high, an increase of 6%. Test the success of Saturday Night Book Fair, Book Fair upgraded to midnight, from 12:00 until 2:00, so that a family of book lovers have more time to pick a good heart, and set up two special bus routes to facilitate the return home or transfer by other modes of transport. Chief Executive Donald Tsang also attended the book fair bit to the twenty students in Primary Four to Six fairy stories. Book Fair hd  invited well-known writer Louis Cha (Jin Yong), Ni Kuang, Professor Lu Weiluan, Liu Xinwu, Yu Hua, Hong Ying, Su Weizhen, and lecturing in early Min.

2007
2007 Book Fair was held in 2007 in the year to 24 July 18 at the first time, experts would provide advice, set the theme, "Reading in Hong Kong." Expansion of exhibition in the atrium, the General Assembly to develop a series of measures to ease the flow, including increasing the extension to 7 to increase the "morning entry ticket", the fare is $10 in the morning to encourage people to approach. Addition of "Reading the Hong Kong Lecture Series", "popular series of Chinese culture" and "Celebrity Reading Sharing Series," and co-operation with the Economic Daily News, set up a "Top Ten Good Books administered election" activities and "entrepreneur talks about reading," and lead the Book Fair out of the exhibition, organised by "reading in Hong Kong: Landmark Tour" and "Reading in Hong Kong: book tour," the two outreach activities, and readers with the "reading" of urban space, culture and history, to read the fun extends into the community.

2008
2008 Book Fair was held 23 to 29 with the theme set to "read the world ‧ into the world." Cooperation with the British Council, set up a "British Day" to promote reading; and Greenpeace co-operation, first held on the 24th green at 』『 "love of books ‧ Aisen Lin Day", hopes to use the platform in Hong Kong Book Fair, publishing industry to promote the use of "forest friendly" paper, protect virgin forests are disappearing. In line with the Beijing Olympics, the ad hoc "Olympic book exhibition" featuring 50 of the Olympic Games and sports-related books. The General Assembly set aside four free stalls to the Hong Kong Publishing Federation and the "Sowers Action" as "a book burning wish ─ books to rebuild schools in Sichuan disaster relief fund-raising plan."

2009
The theme of 2009 was set to "multiple and creative ‧ Book Fair two decades." Exhibition in the atrium expansion project completed, would increase the scale of one-third of the Book Fair, spectators would be able to more spacious and comfortable environment to buy books. Added the "English world" and "multimedia zone" area, focused on promoting the latest English books, electronic books, online publications and various types of educational software. The first set, "Art Gallery", famous for readers offered a number of valuable art collections, including the famous martial arts master Liang Yusheng writer Eileen Chang and photos, manuscripts, signed books, scripts, and other relics; Great Masters Rao paintings, sculpture, tea, jade and bamboo slips. To promote the development of original culture, the first book fair set up a "creative space", showing cartoonist Jimmy, Lau Wan-kit, of Lee and Hsu Cheng Yi's manuscripts, as well as Hong Kong's famous design brand GOD GOD Douglas Young, founder of the creative design. "Super avid reader card" initial public offering.

2010
The theme of 2010 was set to "Green Book." Visitors were expected to 100 million people in this new high. Given 2009's book fair was a model Xuan Bin dominate the girls and caused a lot of visitors to the Book Fair to protest, the Assembly decided to refuse the person signing this Session Book Fair will be held in the application. 
This year's "Kids" moved to Hall 3B-E (3rd floor, New Wing), for parents and children to provide a wider space for activities Kuo, area last year also increased by about 30%. Large demand for light industry, this year's new "e-books and digital publishing" area, brought together about 20 exhibitors showcasing the latest e-books and digital reading products. Area also included a "digital interactive reading area," so that readers could operate electronic reader at the scene, view e-book information, electronic reading experience the convenience and fun. "English World" exhibition, with an area increase over the previous five percent. 
Organiser Hong Kong Trade Development Council to strengthen the co-operation of the Mainland and Taiwan travel agents, will visit Hong Kong Book Fair joined the tour, to encourage visitors to purchase books and participate in cultural activities. PRD departure package tours, some as low as 68 yuan. In addition to co-operation with other travel agencies, the General Assembly Ad Hoc visitors at the Book Fair Box Office and special access, visitors only need to present valid ID, you can visit the book fair fare of 10 yuan. The Hong Kong Tourism Board Visitor Information Centre's book fair will also distribute information and coupons to attract tourists to visit. [1] 
Book Fair from 2010 July 21 to 27 July was held for seven days, book end, book fair attendance of 92 million visitors over thirteen thousand people, representing an increase of two percent. Although an increase in visitors, but unfortunately due to bad weather the past few days and reading electronic books have gotten the reader to accept, rather than the physical book sales fell last year.

2011 
The 22nd edition of the HKTDC Hong Kong Book Fair was held from 20 to 26 July under the theme of "Reading the World, Reading as Self-discovery".  More than 520 exhibitors from 24 countries and regions took part at the fair  The attendance at the fair was about three per cent higher than last year. The figure included some 15,000 tourists, 15 per cent more than 2010 and largely from the Chinese mainland, Macau and Taiwan.

2012 
"Reading the World, We Read therefore We Know" was the theme for this year's book fair which started from 18 to 24 July at the Hong Kong Convention and Exhibition Centre. 17 renowned writers from the Chinese mainland, Hong Kong, Malaysia, Taiwan and the United States attended the Renowned Writers Seminar Series.

2013 
The 24th Hong Kong Book Fair started from 17–23 July this year under the theme of “Reading the World – Reading for a Better World.” The fair featured a number of zones, including its largest English Avenue to date, Teens’ World and e-Books and e-Learning Resources. There, the Sino United Publishing was launching SuperBookcity.com, allowing readers to search and purchase millions of printed books and e-books. E-book vending machines were also being showcased for the first time.

2014 
The 25th HKTDC Hong Kong Book Fair opened from 16–22 July. Carrie Lam Cheng Yuet-ngor, the then Hong Kong SAR Government's Chief Secretary for Administration, together  with HKTDC Executive Director Fred Lam, were the officiating guests for the fair's Opening Ceremony on 16 July. The fair attracted more than 1.01 million visitors.

2015
The Hong Kong Book Fair was held from 15 to 21 of July at HKCEC, Wan Chai.
On 15,16,19 and 20 of July the book fair opened until 22:00.
On the 17,18 of July the book fair opened until midnight.

2016
The Hong Kong Book Fair was held from 20–26 July at HKCEC, Wan Chai.
The theme for this year was Chinese Martial Arts Literature and to promote this, 
Hong Kong Book Fair organised a series of seminars for visitors to explore 
Chinese martial arts literature across different times.  
Also a dedicated zone Chinese Martial Arts Literature set up in the Art
Gallery to introduce classic martial arts novelists.  Martial arts literature has been playing a prominent role in Hong Kong's literary world, cultivating a vast quantity of Martial arts masterpieces over the years. The genre gained continual popularity in Hong Kong during the 50s-60s, when Chinese martial arts novels started to be serialized on newspapers. Such serial stories were so popular that they were re-published as printed novels. Up to now, these martial arts novels have stood the test of time, and are still appealing to a mass audience. Many of the stories have been translated into different languages, and even transformed into comics, TV series, movies or computer games, providing a wide range of channels for the world to understand the essence of Chinese culture.

2017
The Hong Kong Book Fair was held from 19–25 July at HKCEC, Wan Chai.  Under the theme of "Reading the World ･ People, Places, Passions". This year's event attracted about 670 exhibitors from 37 countries and regions ; and more than 320 cultural activities were held during the fair period, with the aim to encourage readers to travel around the world and broaden their horizons. Nearly one million people visited this year book fair.

2018
The Hong Kong Book Fair was held on 18–24 July at HKCEC, Wan Chai. The Gross Exhibition Space was 48,887 M². The theme of this year was Romance Literature.  Chinese and foreign authors of all times had put their words of love into classic literature, touching the hearts of many readers throughout the years.  This year's Book Fair attracted 680 exhibitors from 39 countries and regions.

2019
The Hong Kong Book Fair was held on 17–23 July at HKCEC, Wanchai. The theme for the fair is "Sci-Fi and Mystery", offering a good opportunity for readers to appreciate excellent sci-fi and mystery literature.

2020
In view of the COVID‑19 pandemic situation in Hong Kong, HKTDC has decided to reschedule the book fair that was supposed to be held from 15 to 21 July 2020. It was further announced in August that the book fair will be held from 16 to 22 December. It was officially cancelled on 23 November by the organizer.

Information of previous fair

References

External links

Hong Kong Bookfair-green-day

Annual fairs
Festivals in Hong Kong
Economy of Hong Kong
Book fairs in China
Trade fairs in Hong Kong
1990 establishments in Hong Kong
Annual events in Hong Kong